Belgian Bowl XXI featured the West Flanders Tribes and the Brussels Black Angels in an American football game to decide the Belgian Football League (BFL) champion for the 2008 season. The Tribes won the Belgian Bowl, completing a perfect season with a record of 8-0. The Belgian Bowl victory was the Tribes 3rd in a row.

Playoffs
The 2 teams that play in the Belgian Bowl are the winners of the Belgian Bowl playoffs.

References

External links
Official Belgian Bowl website

American football in Belgium
Belgian Bowl
Belgian Bowl